Bayono–Awbono is a recently discovered Papuan language cluster spoken in Papua Province, Indonesia, to the south of the Somahai languages. All that is known of them is a few hundred words recorded in first-contact situations recorded in Wilbrink (2004) and Hischier (2006).

Languages
Wilbrink (2004) lists 4 distinct language varieties.

Bayono (Enamesi, Swesu), Kovojab (Kvolyab, Kopoyap)
Awbono, Densar

Classification
Noting insufficient evidence, Pawley and Hammarström (2018) leave Bayono–Awbono as unclassified rather than as part of Trans-New Guinea. However, according to Dryer (2022), based on a preliminary quantitative analysis of data from the ASJP database, Bayono–Awbono is likely to be a subgroup of Trans–New Guinea.

Timothy Usher finds enough evidence to classify Awbono–Bayono within the Greater Awyu (Digul River) family.

Wilbrink (2004) notes limited similarity with the neighboring Ok languages, and does not classify Bayono–Awbono with Ok.

Pronouns
The pronouns demonstrate resemblances to the neighboring Ok and Greater Awyu languages, and the pronouns are consistent with Bayono-Awbono belonging to the Trans–New Guinea family:

{|class="wikitable IPA"
!Lect||1sg||2sg
|-
!Awbono
|nɛ
|ɡu
|-
!Bayono
|ne
|ɡwe
|-
!proto-Awyu–Dumut
|*nu-p
|*gu-p
|-
!proto-Ok
|*na-
|*ka-b-/*ku-b-
|-
!proto-TNG
|*na
|*ga
|}

References

Further reading
Hischier, Phyllis (2006). Exploration of the Remote Kopayap and Urajin Areas in West Papua, Indonesia: A First Contact in Kopayap and Urajin. Manuscript.
Wilbrink, Ans (2004). The Kopkaka of Papua: Provisional notes on their language, its language affiliation and on the Kopkaka culture. MA thesis, Vrije Universiteit Amsterdam.

External links 

 Timothy Usher, New Guinea World, Proto–Awbono–Bayono

 
Languages of western New Guinea
Central and South New Guinea languages

Becking–Dawi languages